Benjamin Mooers (April 1, 1758 – February 20, 1838) was a military veteran of both the Revolutionary War and War of 1812, and a politician, serving in the New York State legislature. He also served as a sheriff of Clinton County, New York in between the wars.

Early life
Benjamin Mooers was born in Haverhill, Massachusetts to Abigail and Benjamin Mooers on April 1, 1758. In 1773 Mooers started an apprenticeship under John White, a merchant and importer in Haverhill. He worked with White until the Revolutionary War began, when Mooers enlisted as a volunteer in the Continental Army.

Later life 
In 1783 he settled in the vicinity of Plattsburgh, New York, a frontier settlement at the time. Mooers was the sheriff of Clinton County and a presidential elector in 1808.

During the War of 1812, Mooers returned to military service. He was commissioned as a general in the New York Militia, commanding troops at the Battle of Plattsburgh, on September 11, 1814. After the war, he was elected and served as a member of the New York legislature. Mooers died on February 20, 1838, and was buried at Riverside Cemetery.

Occupation

Chief Purchaser 
In addition to his high-status among military operations, Benjamin Mooers' was known as a landowner in the areas surrounding the Champlain Valley. To the extent that he became known as the Chief Purchaser in the late 1780s. According to accounts of refugees who met with Mooers, he owned large masses of land for which he paid considerably low for. A large amount of the land owned by Mooers' was part of the Refugee Tract.

Lieutenant 
Mooers' served as a lieutenant in the New York militia and the 2nd Canadian Regiment under his maternal uncle, Moses Hazen, during the American Revolutionary War.

Power of Attorney 
Based on his status in the Champlain Valley, Mooers was given powers of attorney by many Canadian Refugees. These powers were delegated to him due to his ownership of nearly 40% of the refugee tract.

War General 
Benjamin Mooers served as a major general in the War of 1812. During this time, he directed troops to defend the United States Against Britain.

Presidential Elector 
He served on the board of individuals who were designed to elect the president during the election on 1808.

References
 1812 In The North Country

1758 births
1838 deaths
American militia generals
People from Haverhill, Massachusetts
Members of the New York State Assembly
1808 United States presidential electors
New York (state) Democratic-Republicans
Military personnel from Massachusetts